Szeto Man Chun (born 5 June 1975) is a Hong Kong football coach and a former professional footballer. He is currently the head coach of Hong Kong Premier League club HK U23 and Hong Kong U-23.

International career
Szeto has played for the Hong Kong national football team for more than 8 years. In his football career, he played a lot of games against various national teams around the world, such as Denmark, Sweden, Brazil, Japan, South Korea and so on. He also played invitation matches with Liverpool and Real Madrid etc. He retired from professional football after the 2008–09 season.

Coaching career
Szeto has started his coaching career during his footballing career. Since 2007, he was one of the coaches of the Hong Kong National Youth Team.

On 27 May 2017, Eastern chairman announced Szeto as Chan Yuen Ting's successor as their head coach. He resigned less than a year later on 19 January 2018 due to a poor results.

In July 2022, it was reported that Szeto has become the head coach of HK U23.

In March 2023, Szeto was appointed as the head coach of Hong Kong U-23.

Executive career
On 4 June 2020, Wigan Athletic announced the takeover of the club by Next Leader Fund L.P. had been completed. Szeto, who was a friend of Next Leader Fund's General Partner, Au Yeung Wai Kay, was named as a director of the club as part of the takeover. Less than a month later he voted them into administration.

Commentator career
He began his commentator career at January 2007 in Hong Kong Cable TV.

Honours
 Kitchee
Hong Kong League Cup: 2005–06, 2006–07
Hong Kong Senior Shield: 2005–06

References

External links
Szeto Man Chun at HKFA

Profile at kitchee.com 

1975 births
Living people
Hong Kong football managers
Hong Kong footballers
Hong Kong international footballers
Association football midfielders
Eastern Sports Club footballers
Happy Valley AA players
Yee Hope players
South China AA players
Kitchee SC players
Hong Kong First Division League players
Expatriate footballers in Macau
Hong Kong League XI representative players